Isognathus swainsonii is a moth of the  family Sphingidae.

Distribution 
It is found from French Guiana, Peru and Brazil to Bolivia.

Description 
The wingspan is about 82 mm. It is similar to Isognathus leachii, but the forewing upperside has more white scaling, there are interrupted white vein-streaks on the distal half of the wing, the basal patch is thinner and the marginal spots at the ends of veins are larger and paler grey.

Biology 
There are probably multiple generations per year.

The larvae have been recorded feeding on Plumeria acuminata. They have long tails and are very colourful, suggesting they are unpalatable to birds.

References

Isognathus
Moths described in 1862